Karl Fürstner (7 June 1848 - 25 April 1906) was a German neurologist and psychiatrist born in Strasburg, Uckermark.

He studied medicine in Würzburg and Berlin, where he received his doctorate in 1871. In 1872 he was an assistant at the pathological institute of the University of Greifswald, and afterwards worked under Karl Westphal (1833-1890) in the psychiatric department at the Berlin-Charité.

In 1878 he became the first physician to hold the chair of psychiatry at the University of Heidelberg. He kept this position until 1890, when he became professor of nervous and mental diseases at the University of Strasbourg. At Heidelberg his vacancy was filled by Emil Kraepelin  (1856-1926). Among Fürstner's better known assistants was eugenicist Alfred Hoche (1865-1943).

Fürstner specialized in the fields of neuropathology and neuroanatomy. His work involved studies of progressive paralysis, the localization of brain tumors, and research of disorders that included postpartum psychosis, gliosis of the cerebral cortex and hemorrhagic pachymeningitis. Among his written works was his graduate thesis, Zur Streitfrage über das Othaematom, of which he discusses "othematoma" (hematoma of the outer ear). This condition was once believed by some doctors to be linked to brain disorders.

References 
 Pagel: Biographical Dictionary (translated from German)
 Biographical Lexicon of Anatomists (translated from German)
  Textbook of Otology for Physicians and Students by Friedrich Bezold

1848 births
1906 deaths
People from Vorpommern-Greifswald
People from the Province of Brandenburg
German neurologists
German psychiatrists
Academic staff of the University of Greifswald
Academic staff of Heidelberg University
Academic staff of the University of Strasbourg
University of Würzburg alumni
Humboldt University of Berlin alumni
Converts to Christianity from Judaism
19th-century German Jews